XMOS is a fabless semiconductor company that develops audio products and multicore microcontrollers.

Company history
XMOS was founded in July 2005 by Ali  Dixon, James Foster, Noel Hurley, David May, and Hitesh Mehta. It received seed funding from the University of Bristol enterprise fund, and Wyvern seed fund.

The name XMOS is a loose reference to Inmos. Some concepts found in XMOS technology (such as channels and threads) are part of the Transputer legacy.

In the autumn of 2006, XMOS secured funding from Amadeus Capital Partners, DFJ Esprit, and Foundation Capital.  It also has strategic investors Robert Bosch Venture Capital GmbH, Huawei Technologies, and Xilinx Inc. In September 2017, XMOS secured
$15M in an investment round lead by Infineon.

In July 2017, XMOS acquired SETEM, a company that specialises in audio algorithms for source separation.

Technology 
XMOS provides solutions for a wide range of applications, including automotive, consumer electronics, and enterprise communications. The technology enables devices to accurately capture and process voice commands and other audio inputs, which can be used for applications such as speech recognition, virtual assistants, and hands-free communication.

The company's core technology is based on its unique xCore architecture, which is a multi-core processor that provides high levels of processing power and efficiency. This architecture allows XMOS to offer voice and audio solutions that are both highly accurate and low-latency, making them ideal for use in a wide range of applications.

References

Microcontroller companies
Fabless semiconductor companies
Companies established in 2005
Semiconductor companies of the United Kingdom
British brands